"Money" is the fourth episode of the BBC sitcom Blackadder II, the second series of Blackadder, which was set in Elizabethan England from 1558 to 1603.

Plot
Blackadder is visited by the baby-eating Bishop of Bath and Wells, who reminds him that he owes £1,000 to the Bank of the Black Monks. The Bishop threatens to sodomise Blackadder with a hot poker if he does not repay the money. 

Lord Percy offers his savings to Blackadder, but Blackadder has already long since found Percy's hiding place and spent his money, as well as Baldrick's. Blackadder has only £85 to his name, which he loses to the Queen following a bet she had about him with Melchett.

Blackadder tries selling Baldrick into prostitution, but makes only a sixpence from a sailor named Arthur, which the Queen also takes. Percy then tries to produce gold using alchemy, but only manages to produce a mysterious green substance.

Deciding to sell his house, Blackadder bullies a couple into paying him £1,100, but is again tricked out of this by the Queen.

Blackadder is then visited again by the Bishop, who prepares to carry out his threat for Blackadder not paying his debts. Before he does so, the Bishop drinks some wine offered to him by Baldrick, which Blackadder has drugged, and falls unconscious.

The Bishop is later woken up by Blackadder, who reveals a painting made of the Bishop in a highly-compromising position with another figure. He uses this to successfully blackmail the Bishop into writing off the debt and giving Blackadder enough money to buy back his house. The Bishop is impressed by the treachery and asks Blackadder who the other figure is, at which point Blackadder reveals Lord Percy.

Cast 

 Rowan Atkinson as Lord Edmund Blackadder
 Tim McInnerny as Lord Percy Percy
 Tony Robinson as Baldrick
 Miranda Richardson as Queen Elizabeth I
 Stephen Fry as Lord Melchett
 Patsy Byrne as Nursie
 Ronald Lacey as the Bishop of Bath and Wells
 Cassie Stuart as Molly
 Lesley Nicol as Mrs. Pants
 John Pierce Jones as Arthur the Sailor
 Tony Aitken as the Mad Beggar
 Philip Pope as Leonardo Acropolis
 Piers Ibbotson as the Messenger
 Barry Craine as Mr. Pants

Legacy
 Bishop of Bath and Wells' Lingering torment of Blackadder, from the Telegraph (7 Dec 2008)

References

External links

 
 

Blackadder episodes
1986 British television episodes
Television shows written by Ben Elton
Cultural depictions of Elizabeth I
Television shows written by Richard Curtis